Bhama Kalapam may refer to
 Bhamakalapam, a traditional dance form popular in Andhra Pradesh
 Bhama Kalapam, a 1988 Indian Telugu-language film by written and directed by Relangi Narasimha Rao
 Bhamakalapam, a 2022 Indian Telugu-language film